Walter Kremershof (3 December 1922 – 17 September 1997) was a German ice hockey player. He competed in the men's tournament at the 1952 Winter Olympics.

References

External links
 

1922 births
1997 deaths
Olympic ice hockey players of Germany
Ice hockey players at the 1952 Winter Olympics
Sportspeople from Krefeld